Antah, also spelled Anta, is a city and a municipality in Baran district in the state of Rajasthan, India.

Geography

Demographics
 India census, Antah had a population of 26,779. Males constitute 52% of the population and females 48%. Antah has an average literacy rate of 61%, higher than the national average of 59.5%; with 62% of the males and 38% of females literate. 17% of the population is under 6 years of age. A National Thermal Power Corporation gas power plant is also situated in Antah. Antah is 50 km far from kota city and 24 km far from baran city.

See also

Antão, name

References

Cities and towns in Baran district